is a Japanese volleyball player who plays for Hisamitsu Springs. She also played for the All-Japan women's volleyball team. She competed at the 2020 Summer Olympics, in Women's volleyball.

Career 
Ishii played for the All-Japan team for the first time at the Montreux Volley Masters in June 2011.

Clubs
  Toyo Junior High
  Shujitsu Highschool
  Hisamitsu Springs (2010–)

Awards

Individuals
2013 Japan-Korea V.League Top Match - MVP
 2013-14 V.Premier League - Best Server
 2014 Asian Club Championship - Best Outside Spiker
 2015 Montreux Volley Masters - MVP, Best Outside Spiker
 2017/18 V.League - MVP, Best Wing Spiker (best 6) and Best receiver

Clubs
 2011-2012 V.Premier League -  Runner-Up, with Hisamitsu Springs.
 2012 Empress's Cup -  Champion, with Hisamitsu Springs.
 2012-2013 V.Premier League -  Champion, with Hisamitsu Springs.
 2013 - Japan-Korea V.League Top Match -  Champion, with Hisamitsu Springs.
 2013 - Kurowashiki All Japan Volleyball Tournament -  Champion, with Hisamitsu Springs.
 2013 - Empress's Cup -  Champion, with Hisamitsu Springs.
 2013-2014 V.Premier League -  Champion, with Hisamitsu Springs.
 2014 Asian Club Championship -  Champion, with Hisamitsu Springs.
 2014 - Empress's Cup -  Champion, with Hisamitsu Springs.
 2014-2015 V.Premier League -  Runner-Up, with Hisamitsu Springs.

National Team 
 2013 Asian Championship -  Silver medal
 2014 FIVB World Grand Prix -  Silver medal
 2015 Montreux Volley Masters -  Silver medal

References

External links
 V.League - Profile
 Hisamitsu Springs - Profile

Japanese women's volleyball players
Living people
1991 births
People from Kurashiki
Japan women's international volleyball players
Olympic volleyball players of Japan
Volleyball players at the 2016 Summer Olympics
Volleyball players at the 2018 Asian Games
Volleyball players at the 2020 Summer Olympics
Asian Games competitors for Japan